The Independent Group for Change, also known as Change UK, was a British centrist, pro-European Union political party, founded in February 2019 and dissolved ten months later, shortly after all its MPs lost their seats in the 2019 general election. Its principal policy was support for a second withdrawal referendum on European Union membership, in which it would campaign to remain in the EU.  On economic issues it expressed a commitment to the social market economy.

In February 2019, seven MPs resigned from the Labour Party to sit as The Independent Group. They were dissatisfied by Labour's leftward political direction under Jeremy Corbyn's leadership, its approach to Brexit and its handling of allegations of antisemitism within the party. They were soon joined by four more MPs, including three from the governing Conservative Party who disliked their party's approach to Brexit and its perceived move rightward. That April, the group registered as a political party under the name Change UK – The Independent Group and appointed former Conservative MP Heidi Allen as their leader so as to compete in the 2019 European Parliament election.

Following the party's failure to secure any seats in that election, six of its eleven MPs, including Allen, left the party and Anna Soubry took over as leader. Four of the six formed The Independents grouping and two defected to the Liberal Democrats. Later, three of The Independents also joined the Liberal Democrats. Following a legal dispute with petition website Change.org, in June the party adopted the name The Independent Group for Change. Three of the party's MPs stood for re-election in the 2019 general election. None of them was re-elected, each losing to candidates from their former parties. On 19 December 2019, Soubry announced the party's dissolution.

History

Formation

The group was founded by MPs Luciana Berger, Ann Coffey, Mike Gapes, Chris Leslie, Gavin Shuker, Angela Smith and Chuka Umunna, who simultaneously announced their resignations from the Labour Party on 18 February 2019. Rather than forming a party, the group were a coalition of officially Independent MPs referring to themselves as The Independent Group. Leslie, Shuker and Smith had previously lost no-confidence motions brought by their Constituency Labour Parties. Berger had two no-confidence motions brought against her but both were withdrawn. Ian Murray planned to resign alongside the others but pulled out shortly before the launch.

The media compared the group to the Gang of Four which split from the Labour Party in order to found the Social Democratic Party in 1981. Four of the seven founding members (Berger, Gapes, Shuker and Leslie) were Labour and Co-operative Party MPs; they left both parties. Announcing the resignations, Berger described Labour as having become "institutionally antisemitic", while Leslie said Labour had been "hijacked by the machine politics of the hard left" and Gapes said he was "furious that the Labour leadership is complicit in facilitating Brexit".

On the day of the group's launch, founding member Angela Smith appeared on the BBC's Politics Live programme, where she said, in a discussion about racism, that: "The recent history of the party I've just left suggested it's not just about being black or a funny tin... you know, a different... from the BAME community". The offending phrase was partially uttered, but it was widely reported to be "funny tinge". Smith apologised shortly afterwards, saying, "I'm very upset that I misspoke so badly." Commentators noted an irony, given the fact that the group had been formed in response to perceived racism.

On 19 February 2019, Joan Ryan announced her departure from the Labour Party, becoming the first MP to join after the group's formation. Ryan had previously lost a vote of no-confidence brought by her constituency party. On 20 February 2019, three Conservative MPs left their party to join the group: Sarah Wollaston, Heidi Allen and Anna Soubry, citing the handling of Brexit by the Prime Minister (including "red lines" which alienated most Remainers); the party's reliance on the European Research Group (a group supporting a no-deal Brexit) and the Democratic Unionist Party (DUP) in passing Brexit-related legislation; what they saw as the takeover of the Conservative Party by "right wing, ... hard-line anti-EU" MPs; and lack of concern from the Conservative Party for the "most vulnerable in society", as reasons for their departure.

Umunna rejected the notion of any merger with the Liberal Democrats, with Soubry calling on one-nation Conservatives and "like-minded Lib Dems" to join the group. A few former Conservative and Labour parliamentarians publicly declared a switch of allegiance to the new group, while in February some Labour local councillors in England left the Party with the intention of aligning with The Independent Group.

Registration as a political party
In March 2019, the group announced that it had applied to the Electoral Commission to register as a political party under the name "Change UK – The Independent Group", in order to be able to stand candidates if the UK participated in the May 2019 European elections. Heidi Allen was appointed interim leader, pending an inaugural party conference planned for September 2019.

The registration was confirmed by the Electoral Commission on 15 April 2019. The party's proposed emblem, however, was rejected by the Commission, both for inclusion of the TIG acronym which they considered insufficiently well-known and for use of a hashtag.

On 15 April 2019, the centrist Renew Party, which had formed in 2017 but failed to win seats, announced that it would be supporting Change UK – The Independent Group in the European Elections. Change UK welcomed the move and said it would accept applications from Renew-approved candidates to become Change UK candidates.

European Parliament election
On 16 April 2019, it was announced that MEPs Julie Girling and Richard Ashworth had joined Change UK. Both MEPs had been elected for the Conservative Party, but were suspended from the Conservatives after supporting a motion in the European Parliament saying sufficient progress had not been made in Brexit negotiations to allow trade talks to start. Both Ashworth and Girling were members of the centre-right European People's Party group in the European Parliament.

However, on 10 May, Girling, who decided not to stand in the 2019 European Elections, encouraged Remain supporters in the South West to vote for the Liberal Democrats, saying they were "clearly the lead Remain party in the South West". Girling and Change UK later said that she had never been a member or one of their MEPs.

The party announced on 23 April that it would stand a full slate of candidates in Great Britain for the European Parliament elections, including Ashworth, writer Rachel Johnson (sister of Conservative MPs Jo and Boris Johnson); former BBC journalist Gavin Esler; former Conservative MPs Stephen Dorrell and Neil Carmichael; former Labour MEP Carole Tongue; former Labour MPs Roger Casale and Jon Owen Jones; former Liberal Democrat MEP Diana Wallis; and the former deputy Prime Minister of Poland Jacek Rostowski.

Within a day, controversial tweets, some of an alleged racist nature, by two candidates—including the top candidate for the Scottish constituency—were discovered, leading to their withdrawals. The Muslim Council of Great Britain and anti-racism charity Tell MAMA condemned the selection of a third candidate, Nora Mulready, who they said had conflated Islam with terrorism and legitimised the far right; this was dismissed by Mulready and by Change UK as a "smear campaign". Prominent LGBT journalists have condemned the selection of Rostowski for his anti-gay marriage stance, although he was believed to have since recanted homophobic remarks made in 2011 and 2013 about same-sex relationships.

On 15 May, David MacDonald, who had earlier replaced Joseph Russo as the party's lead candidate in Scotland following controversy over the latter's tweets, defected from the party and encouraged supporters to vote for the Scottish Liberal Democrats. In an interview with The Times, the lead candidate in South West England, Rachel Johnson, described the party as a "sinking ship", criticised the leadership structure and said that Change UK was a "terrible" name.

On 20 May 2019, interim leader Heidi Allen suggested that the party might not exist at the next general election and hinted at the formation of an alliance with the Liberal Democrats. On 22 May, she said that she and Wollaston wanted to advise Remain supporters to vote tactically for the Liberal Democrats in the European elections outside of London and South East England, but they were overruled by other party members. Allen said she threatened to resign as leader over the issue of whether to endorse the Liberal Democrats in some regions. She denied her party was in disarray.

Between the European Parliament polling day and the count, with the Liberal Democrats expected to have done much better in the vote than Change UK, Umunna said that he thought a pact between Change UK and the Liberal Democrats at the next election "would be sensible". Allen then said she would go "one step further" and implied she wanted a merger with the Liberal Democrats. However, Soubry criticised Allen's tactical voting comments and the idea of any imminent alliance with the Liberal Democrats, describing talk of an alliance as being "a long way down the line".

The party won no seats in the European elections, garnering 3.3% of the vote overall. Their highest vote was 5.3% in London. They were closest to winning a seat in the South East England constituency where they got 4.2% and were 3.1% away from a seat.

An internal party report was supposedly critical of some of the MPs for supposedly talking down the party's prospects.

Resignations 
After a meeting of the party's MPs on 4 June 2019, described as "amicable" by the Financial Times but "fraught" by the New Statesman, six of the party's MPs – Berger, Shuker, Smith, Umunna, Wollaston and interim party leader Allen – announced their resignation from the party. The other five MPs remained in the party, with Brexit and Justice spokeswoman Anna Soubry becoming leader.

In an article shortly before the announcement of the resignations, Stephen Bush of the New Statesman described three viewpoints in the party: a group favouring merger with the Liberal Democrats, including Allen and Umunna; a group ideologically unsympathetic towards the Liberal Democrats, including Gapes, Leslie, Ryan and Soubry; and a group who supported reverting to being a loose collection of independents that could attract Labour and Conservatives defectors who would find it difficult to switch to a rival party – another New Statesman article identified Shuker as being in this group. The Financial Times described a longstanding split between Umunna and Leslie, both of whom had vied to be the leading force within the party, with the choice of Allen as interim leader having been made to defuse tensions.

In an interview that evening, Soubry said that those leaving wanted Change UK to become a "movement" that did not field candidates. The New Statesman commented that most of the MPs with links to donors had left, and that the party's finances were not secure.

Rumours continued that some, but not all, of those who left the party would eventually join the Liberal Democrats, with the New Statesman suggesting that Umunna, Wollaston and Allen were best placed to be able to win re-election as Liberal Democrats. Umunna joined the Liberal Democrats in June. On 10 July, Berger, Shuker, Smith and Allen along with John Woodcock formed a non-party group called The Independents. By the time of the election, Berger, Smith and Allen had left this grouping to join the Liberal Democrats.

Naming dispute with Change.org and name change

At the time of the party's registration, the petitions website Change.org announced that it would challenge the branding, which it regarded as having "hijacked" its identity. Shortly after announcing themselves as Change UK, Soubry accidentally called the party "Change.org" in parliament. Threats from the website to sue resulted in the party making an application to the Electoral Commission on 13 June 2019 to change its name to The Independent Group for Change, which was approved on 5 July.

2019 general election and deregistration 
Before the 2019 general election, the party announced that the only seats it would contest would be Broxtowe, Ilford South and Nottingham East, where Soubry, Gapes and Leslie, respectively, were seeking re-election. Coffey and Ryan did not stand for re-election. The Liberal Democrats announced that they would not stand against Soubry in Broxtowe.

In the election on 12 December 2019, all three of the party's candidates lost their seats: Soubry and Gapes came third in their seats, while Leslie was fourth. Soubry had the highest vote share at 8.5%. Of its six former members, Allen did not stand in the election, Shuker stood as an independent candidate and the other four stood for the Liberal Democrats. All lost their seats, with Berger performing best, coming second with 31.9%, standing in a different constituency, Finchley and Golders Green.

Soubry announced on 19 December 2019 that their management council had agreed to deregister with the Electoral Commission and begin the process of closing down the Independent Group for Change. The party tweeted: "It was right to shine a spotlight on Britain's broken politics. But having taken stock and with no voice now in parliament, we begin the process of winding up our party. Thanks to all who stood with us." The party was formally deregistered by the Electoral Commission on 5 July 2020.

Reactions

Labour Party
On 19 February 2019, Labour leader Jeremy Corbyn responded that he was "disappointed" by the actions of the MPs leaving Labour. Labour Shadow Chancellor John McDonnell said that Independent Group MPs had a "responsibility" to resign and fight by-elections, as they had been elected as Labour MPs and should seek the approval of the electorate for their new platform. Other Labour Party figures stressed reflection, with deputy leader Tom Watson imploring his party to change in order to stave off further defections. Jon Lansman, the founder of Momentum, said he had "personal sympathy" for Berger because of the "hate and abuse" she had suffered. However, the six other former Labour MPs were, in his opinion, malcontents opposed to Corbyn's leadership.

Labour MP Ruth George, who had been asked to respond to a Facebook comment suggesting the group's financial backers were "Israelis", replied that "Support from the State of Israel, which supports both Conservative and Labour Friends of Israel of which Luciana was chair is possible and I would not condemn those who suggest it, especially when the group's financial backers are not being revealed". After Jewish groups said that she was indulging an antisemitic conspiracy theory, she apologised and withdrew her comment.

On 25 February, Labour announced that it would back moves for a second EU referendum in the coming weeks, a move interpreted as being, in part, in reaction to the threat of further defections to The Independent Group.

On 19 March, MPs passed a motion put forward by Labour to remove Gapes, as well as non-TIG independent Ian Austin, from their seats on the Foreign Affairs Select Committee they held as part of the Labour Party's allocation. They were replaced by Labour MPs Conor McGinn and Catherine West. Gapes called the move "a sad day for the independence of Select Committees", while Labour said that it was right that the party filled its allocation of seats on the committees.

Conservative Party
On 20 February 2019, Prime Minister and Conservative leader Theresa May stated that she was "saddened" by the departure of Anna Soubry, Sarah Wollaston and Heidi Allen. Former Conservative Prime Minister David Cameron wrote in a statement on Twitter that he respected but disagreed with the three MPs' decision, as the party needs "strong voices at every level of the party calling for the modern, compassionate Conservatism that saw the Conservative Party return to office."

Liberal Democrats
On 18 February 2019, before the breakaway, Liberal Democrats leader Vince Cable said that his party would "work with them in some form" but that his party would not be "subsumed" by them. On 19 February, Cable later added that he has "offered a hand of friendship to the new Independent Group" and sees "the way forward as a collaborative arrangement, a confederation of groups who have a lot in common". On 20 February Cable also suggested that the Liberal Democrats might not put up candidates against members of the Independent Group at future elections. On 21 February, former Liberal Democrat leader Tim Farron said in a radio interview that it was "entirely possible" that the two groups could merge to form a new centrist political party.

On 23 February, Cable contacted members of The Independent Group to seek support for his proposed parliamentary motion for a second Brexit referendum. The Liberal Democrats signalled support for the amendment, along with the Scottish National Party and Plaid Cymru.

In March 2019, it was reported by Business Insider that the Liberal Democrats and The Independent Group held discussions about the possibility of forming an electoral alliance where joint candidates would stand under the same "umbrella".

Cable proposed standing joint candidates with the Greens and Change UK on a common policy of seeking a second referendum on Brexit at the European Parliament elections, but both other parties rejected the idea. On 24 April 2019, an unverified internal Change UK document memo leaked describing their plans to target Liberal Democrat donors and members in an attempt to supplant the Liberal Democrats. Part of the Change UK objectives specified in the memo were "No mergers, pacts or alliances." On 26 April, Cable said that Change UK had thrown away opportunities at the 2019 European Parliament election had they pooled their strength, but that the Lib Dems and Change UK had agreed a "non-aggression pact" to discourage "friendly fire". After the Liberal Democrats came second in the European elections and Change UK failed to win any seats, the Liberal Democrats suggested they would make it clear that they would welcome Change UK MPs joining their party (as Umunna, Wollaston, Berger, Smith and Allen subsequently did).

Structure and aims
The party was launched as a group of independent MPs with a convenor (initially Gavin Shuker) and spokesperson (initially Chuka Umunna). It was established without a formal policy platform. In March 2019, this structure was changed as the group applied for registration as a political party with Heidi Allen as its leader (on an interim basis until an annual conference could be held). The party's registration was confirmed in April 2019. In June 2019, Allen left the party and Anna Soubry replaced her as leader. By July 2019, the party employed one member of staff on a full-time basis, down from 11 staff employed during the European Parliament election campaign.

Chris Leslie described the party as offering a home to those on the centre-left or in the "liberal" or "one nation" tradition. The party was expressly pro-European, supporting calls for a further referendum on the UK's membership of the European Union, and was considered to be centrist. The party's slogan was "Politics is broken. Let's change it", and it stated that it aimed to pursue evidence-led policies, rather than those led by ideology, with the group being tolerant of differing opinions.

Specific stated values included a "diverse, mixed social market economy", freedom of the press, environmentalism, devolution, subsidiarity and opposition to Brexit. All of its MPs supported a second referendum on the EU. Although the party never published a manifesto, it listed eleven "values", including that the government must do "whatever it takes" to protect national security, as Britain is "a great country of which people are rightly proud." Shuker stated that "[we] back well-regulated business but in return we expect them to provide decent, secure and well-paid jobs" and Leslie stressed the group was pro-NATO.

On 14 March 2019, Sarah Wollaston's amendment calling for a second EU referendum was called by the Speaker of the House of Commons, the first TIG amendment to be called. This was the first time that parliament had the opportunity to directly vote on a second referendum. However, after both the People's Vote and Best for Britain campaigns advised supporters not to vote for the amendment, and the Labour Party whipped its MPs to abstain, the amendment fell 85–334.

Funding
The group was supported in its aims by The Independent Group (TIG) Ltd (previously named Gemini A Ltd), a non-trading company started by Shuker and registered in England and Wales. Berger stated that the seven founders funded the launch themselves.

The group claimed that thousands of donors gave small amounts within days of the launch. On 23 February 2019, David Garrard, previously a major donor to the Labour Party, was reported to have given financial support to the group; the amount as reported by The Sunday Telegraph was £1.5 million. A "significant" donation to the group was later made by crossbencher Lord Myners, the former City Minister under Labour Prime Minister Gordon Brown.

The party was not entitled to the parliamentary financial assistance for opposition parties (Short Money) as this is not available to political parties established in the middle of a parliamentary term.

A report by the party's auditors, published as part of the group's accounts filed with Companies House in May 2020, found that bank statements and records of donors had been "inappropriately destroyed" by staff members during the group's winding down and could not be satisfactorily reconstructed. The auditors stated that nothing had come to their attention to suggest there were any "material errors in the financial statements", but they were "unable to determine" whether any adjustments to financial statements "might have been found to be necessary had the scope of our work not been limited". In response, Soubry's partner, Neil Davidson, who had acted as the party's treasurer, stated that the party had "absolutely nothing to hide".

Leadership 
At the time of the group's formation, Gavin Shuker was named as the group's convener and Chuka Umunna as the spokesperson. The group used a collective approach to leadership, with Umunna saying that "all the members of our group have... a responsibility to provide leadership". Registration as a party mandated having a formal leader. Allen was appointed interim leader when the party was officially formed on 29 March 2019, with the intention that a permanent leader would be elected at a party conference in September. When Allen left the party on 4 June, Anna Soubry took over the leadership role.

Members of elected bodies

Members of Parliament

MPs who remained in the party until dissolution

MPs who left the party

Frontbench team 
Heidi Allen announced a frontbench team after her appointment as interim leader in March 2019.

Representation in other levels of government
In February 2019, Labour councillors in over ten councils also left the party and intended to align with The Independent Group. Two former Labour councillors in Brighton and Hove Council left the party to form their own independent group on 25 February, aligning with the Parliamentary group. There were further resignations from the party by Labour councillors in Barnet, Bexley, Derby, Salford, Stafford, and Southwark and by Conservative councillors in South Bucks and Calderdale. It is unknown how many of these councillors supported Change UK, but many gave the same reasons as the Labour MPs who left the party: alleged antisemitism in Labour, Corbyn's leadership and Brexit.

Richard Ashworth, an MEP who was elected as a Conservative in 2014, and had been a European People's Party-affiliated independent since 2018, joined Change UK on 16 April 2019. In the European Parliament election the following month, Ashworth was the first list candidate for Change UK in South East England but was not reelected, with the list gaining 4.2% of the votes.

Electoral history

See also
List of British politicians who have crossed the floor
List of Labour Party (UK) breakaway parties

Further reading

 James Dennison. 2020. "How Niche Parties React to Losing Their Niche: The Cases of the Brexit Party, the Green Party and Change UK." Parliamentary Affairs, Volume 73, Pages 125–141

References

External links

2019 establishments in the United Kingdom
2019 disestablishments in the United Kingdom
Brexit
Centrist political parties in the United Kingdom
Conservative Party (UK) breakaway groups
Defunct political parties in the United Kingdom
February 2019 events in the United Kingdom
Labour Party (UK) breakaway groups
Political parties established in 2019
Political parties disestablished in 2019
Pro-European political parties in the United Kingdom